Dork is a pejorative term for a person (compare with "dweeb" and "fool").

Dork may also refer to:

People
 Dork Sahagian, Armenian-American climate scientist

Arts, entertainment, and media
 Dork (EP), an album by AFI
 Dork (magazine), a UK music monthly
 Dork, a common unofficial name for the higher-definition posable man CGI character introduced in the CGI program Poser 3 and Poser 4
 Dork, the card game also known as President and other names 
 Dork: The Incredible Adventures of Robin ‘Einstein' Varghese, a novel by Sidin Vadukut

Other uses

 Dork disc, also called dust shield or spoke protector, is a disc, usually made of plastic, placed in the rear wheel of bicycles to prevent the chain from dropping or jamming into the spokes.
 Google Dork, a technique that uses Google Search find security issues or to perform OSINT.

See also
 Dorking (disambiguation)